Muricopsis haidari is a species of sea snail, a marine gastropod mollusk in the family Muricidae, the murex snails or rock snails.

Description
The length of the shell attains 8.95 mm.

Distribution
This marine species occurs off Senegal.

References

 Houart, R., 2003. - Two new muricids (Gastropoda:Muricidae) from west Africa. Novapex 4(2–3): 51–56

Muricidae
Gastropods described in 2003